Rckaela Maree Ramos Aquino (born July 4, 1999) is a Guamanian freestyle wrestler. In the 57 kg category, Aquino won gold at the 2018 Micronesian Games. She won gold at the Oceanian Championships in 2018 and 2019 as well as silver in 2017. She qualified for the women's freestyle 53 kg into the Olympic competition, by progressing to the top two finals at the 2021 African & Oceania Qualification Tournament in Hammamet, Tunisia. She was eliminated in her first match in the women's 53 kg event.

References

External links
 
 
 

1999 births
Living people
Guamanian female sport wrestlers
Olympic wrestlers of Guam
Wrestlers at the 2020 Summer Olympics
21st-century American women